The following are the national records in athletics in Egypt maintained by the Egyptian Athletic Federation (EAF).

Outdoor

Key to tables:

+ = en route to a longer distance

h = hand timing

A = affected by altitude

NWI = no wind measurement

Wo = women only race

Men

Women

Indoor

Men

Women

References
General
World Athletics Statistic Handbook 2019: National Outdoor Records
World Athletics Statistic Handbook 2018: National Indoor Records
Specific

External links
 EAF web site

Egypt
Athletics
Records
Athletics